Natalie Tong Sze-wing (born 3 May 1981) is a Hong Kong actress and model previously contracted to TVB.

Career
Before becoming an actress, Natalie Tong was a full-time model. She once studied in Methodist College. Tong gained popularity after landing her first lead role in the 2008 romantic drama, The Seventh Day, alongside Bosco Wong. She received broader attention with her performance in the 2010 custome drama, A Fistful of Stances, garnering her first nomination for Best Supporting Actress and made it into top 5. With her performance in 2010, Tong won the Most Improved Female Artiste award at the 2010 TVB Anniversary Awards.

In 2017, Tong earned critical acclaim in the drama My Unfair Lady. With her role as Cherry, she won the Best Actress award at the 2017 TVB Anniversary Awards.

In 2019, Tong starred in critical acclaimed medical drama Big White Duel, earning positive reviews. With her role as Zoe in the drama, she was placed among the top 5 nominations for both the Best Actress and Most Popular Female Character at the 2019 TVB Anniversary Awards.

In September 2022, Tong’s contract with TVB ended.

Filmography

Television series

Films

Awards and nominations

References

External links

 
 
 Official TVB Blog of Natalie Tong
 

1981 births
Living people
21st-century Hong Kong actresses
Hong Kong female models
Hong Kong film actresses
Hong Kong television actresses
TVB actors